Stege Pharmacy was founded in 1706 in Stege on the island of Møn, Denmark.

History
Stege Pharmacy was founded on 16 January 1706 by  Frederik Christian Hartmann.

Architecture
The pharmacy consists of a main wing from 1799 and a side wing from 1889. It was listed on the Danish registry of protected buildings and places in 1024 and the scope of the heritage listing was extended in 1992.

References

External links
 Official website
 History
 Marcus Mackeprang

Pharmacies of Denmark
Listed pharmacy buildings in Denmark
Listed buildings and structures in Vordingborg Municipality
Danish companies established in 1706